These are the complete Grand Prix racing results for Red Bull Racing.

Complete Formula One results

2000s
(key)

2010s
(key)

2020s
(key)

Notes
* – Season still in progress.
† – The driver did not finish the Grand Prix, but was classified as he completed over 90% of the race distance.
‡ – Half points awarded as less than 75% of race distance was completed.

References

External links
 Red Bull Racing results at ChicaneF1

Formula One constructor results
Red Bull Racing